Conrad Henfling (1648–1716 Ansbach, Germany), musicologist, musician, mathematician and lawyer was an official and privy councilor (Hofrat) at the court of the Margrave of Ansbach, Germany. He also invented a new type of keyboard for organ and harpsichord, the design of which was extended by Paul von Janko in his 1882 patent for a keyboard layout.

In a letter dated 30 August 1706, he wrote to Gottfried Wilhelm Leibniz dealing with many issues of music theory he sets out detailed calculations for a method of musical temperament, using Euclid's algorithm in his reasoning. Leibniz had Henfling's work published as "Epistola de novo suo systemate musico" in Miscellanea berolinensia, in 1710.

Further reading
Leibniz und Der Briefwechsel zwischen Henfling Conrad by Rudolf von Herausgegeben Haase, Vittorio Klostermann, Frankfurt am Main, 1982, preview at Google Books
La musique, une pratique cachée de l'arithmétique? by Patrice Bailhache
The Hänfling/Bümler Temperament, a Trigger for Bach’s Well-Tempered Clavier?

Not music related
Theses inaugurales iuridicae circa ius retorsionis iniuriarum verbalium by Conrad Henfling, Argentorati, 1678, at Google Books

References

German musicologists
German music theorists
People from Ansbach
1648 births
1716 deaths
17th-century German mathematicians
18th-century German mathematicians
Number theorists
17th-century German writers
17th-century German male writers
18th-century German writers
18th-century German male writers